WRKH (96.1 FM) is the call sign for the Mobile, Alabama classic rock formatted radio station known as "96.1 The Rocket". The station is owned by San Antoniobased iHeartMedia. Its studios are located inside the building of unrelated television station WKRG-TV on Broadcast Drive in Mobile, and the transmitter is near Spanish Fort, Alabama.

Programming
The station is primarily classic rock. Since 2002, the station has competed with WZNF, a Gulfport, Mississippi, classic rock station. That station's signal can reach Mobile, WRKH's primary listening area. WRKH broadcasts a wide variety of music considered classic rock, and, most recently, some music from the early 1990s has been heard  various Pearl Jam and Red Hot Chili Peppers songs have been played. WRKH also broadcasts the syndicated John Boy and Billy Big Show on Monday-Saturday mornings, and Chip Nelson on afternoons. Starting with the 2016 season, as part of an agreement with iHeartMedia and the University of South Alabama, coverage of USA Jaguars football will move from WMXC to WRKH.

Translators

External links

RKH
Classic rock radio stations in the United States
IHeartMedia radio stations
Radio stations established in 1964
1964 establishments in Alabama